Gavrukova is a rural locality (a village) in Verkh-Invenskoye Rural Settlement, Kudymkarsky District, Perm Krai, Russia. The population was 114 as of 2010. There are 10  streets.

Geography 
Gavrukova is located 29 km southwest of Kudymkar (the district's administrative centre) by road. Kalinina is the nearest rural locality.

References 

Rural localities in Kudymkarsky District